Pleioblastus is an East Asian genus of monopodial bamboos in the grass family Poaceae. They are native to China and Japan, and naturalized in scattered places in Korea, Europe, New Zealand, and the Western Hemisphere.

The plant spreads by vigorous underground rhizomes which run along just beneath the soil surface, producing plantlets at the nodes.  These can be used to propagate new plants, but if not removed they can become invasive.

The species Pleioblastus variegatus (green and cream stripes), and P. viridistriatus (green and yellow stripes) have gained the Royal Horticultural Society's Award of Garden Merit. 

Genetic research suggests that this genus may properly be part of the genus Arundinaria.

Species

formerly included
see Acidosasa Ampelocalamus Chimonocalamus Drepanostachyum Oligostachyum Pseudosasa Sasaella Sinobambusa Yushania

References

Bambusoideae
Flora of China
Flora of Japan
Bambusoideae genera
Taxa named by Takenoshin Nakai